Calocyrtoceras is a genus of orthocerids (Cephalopoda, Nautiloidea), from the middle Silurian of North America (Quebec) and central Europe.

The shell, or conch, of Calocyrtoceras is generally characteristic of its family, the Paraphragmitidae, an annulated cyrtocone. In the case of Calocyrtoceras striated both transversely and longitudinally.

Similar Cyrtocycloceras from the Middle Silurian of Europe is only striated transversely while similar Gaspocyclocas from the  Middle Silurian of North America is only striated longitudinally.

References

 Walter C. Sweet, 1964. Nautiloidea -Orthocerida. Treatise on Invertebrate Paleontology, Part K. Geological Society of America.
 Calocyrtoceras, Fossilworks, PaleoDB gateway

Prehistoric nautiloid genera
Silurian animals